Miloš Bajić (born 27 April 1994) is a Bosnian-Herzegovinian footballer.

Club career

OFK Beograd
Before signing his first professional contract, Bajić was the highest-scoring player in the entire OFK Beograd youth system for players up to 17 years of age. He made his professional debut with OFK Beograd against Red Star Belgrade on November 5, 2011 at the age of 17.

Napredak Kruševac
On January 15, 2012, OFK Beograd moved Bajić to FK Napredak Kruševac. By the end of the year, he had built a reputation as an exciting prospect with his frequent goal-scoring at such a young age. On October 20, 2012, in a 5-0 win against Sloga Kraljevo, Bajić played only one of 90 minutes of gametime and still scored a goal.

Mladost Lučani
Bajič joined Mladost Lučani in summer 2015.

Honours
Napredak Kruševac
Serbian First League: 2012–13

References

External links
Miloš Bajić at Srbijafudbal.net

1994 births
Living people
Sportspeople from Banja Luka
Serbs of Bosnia and Herzegovina
Association football forwards
Bosnia and Herzegovina footballers
Serbian footballers
OFK Beograd players
FK Napredak Kruševac players
FK Mladost Lučani players
FK BSK Borča players
OFK Bačka players
FK Smederevo players
FK IMT players
Serbian First League players
Serbian SuperLiga players